The 11th Indian Infantry Division was an infantry division of the Indian Army during World War II. It formed part of Indian III Corps in the Malaya Command during the Battle of Malaya. The division was re-raised on 1 April 1965 and is presently part of the XII Corps of Southern Command. It is presently responsible for safeguarding the borders with Pakistan along Southern Rajasthan and Gujarat.

History

It was originally commanded by Major-General Murray-Lyon until 24 December 1941. Under Murray-Lyon the 11th Indian Division was defeated at the Battle of Jitra and suffered some of its worst casualties during the retreat from Jitra and at the Battle of Gurun.

Murray-Lyon was fired by Lieut. Gen. Arthur Percival and replaced by Brig. A.C.M. Paris and then Maj. Gen. Billy Key. This division suffered such heavy casualties during the early stages of the campaign, that the 1st Leicesters and the 2nd East Surreys were forced to amalgamate, becoming the British Battalion and the 1/8th Punjab and the 2/9th Jats were also amalgamated, becoming the Jat-Punjab Battalion. The 6th and 15th Infantry Brigades were also amalgamated becoming the 6th/15th Indian Infantry Brigade.

After the Battle of Jitra the 11th Division, under Major-General Paris, inflicted heavy casualties on the Japanese at the Battle of Kampar, but was almost completely destroyed at the Battle of Slim River. The division was reformed in Singapore with the remains of the 9th Indian Division.

The 11th Indian Division surrendered to the Japanese on 15 February 1942, along with about 130,000 other British and Commonwealth soldiers, when Singapore was surrendered.

Formation
On 10 December 1941, for more details of the brigade units see the individual brigade articles

6th Indian Infantry Brigade
Brig. William Oswald Lay
1st Battalion, 8th Punjab Regiment - Lieut. Col. R.C.S.Bates
2nd Battalion, East Surrey Regiment - Lieut.Col. G.E. Swinton MC
2nd Battalion, 16th Punjab Regiment - Lieut. Col. Henry Sloane Larkin

15th Indian Infantry Brigade
Brig. K.A. Garrett/ W. St. John Carpendale
1st Battalion, Leicestershire Regiment - Lieut. Col. Esmond Morrison (Later commanded the British Battalion)
1st Battalion, 14th Punjab Regiment - Lieut.Col.James Fitzpatrick (Wounded at Asun)
2nd Battalion, 9th Jat Regiment - Lt.Col. Charles Knowler Tester

28th Indian Infantry Brigade
Brig. W.St.John Carpendale/ Ray Selby
2nd Battalion, 1st Gurkha Rifles - Lieut.Col.Jack Fulton (Died of wounds as a P.O.W)
2nd Battalion, 2nd Gurkha Rifles - Lieut. Col. G.H.D. Woollcombe
2nd Battalion, 9th Gurkha Rifles - Lieut.Col.W.R.(Ray) Selby

Support units
3rd Cavalry - Lieut. Col. C.P.G.De Winton
1st Battalion, Bahawalpur Infantry, Indian State Forces - Lieut.Col. H.E.Tyrell
137th Field Regiment - Lieut. Col. Charles Holmes Royal Artillery (RA) (24x25pdrs)
155th (Lanarkshire Yeomanry) Field Regiment, Royal Artillery - Lieut. Col. Augustus Murdoch (16x4.5 inch Howitzers)
22nd Mountain Regiment - Lieut. Col. G.L.Hughes Indian Artillery (IA)  (12x3.7 inch Howitzers)
80th Anti-Tank Regiment RA - Lieut. Col. W.E.S.Napier (48x2pdrs/47mm Breda)
3rd Field Company, Indian Engineers (IE)
17th Field Company IE
23rd Field Company IE
46th Army Troops Company IE
43rd Field Park Company IE

Assigned brigades
All these brigades were assigned or attached to the division at some time during World War II
8th Indian Infantry Brigade
12th Indian Infantry Brigade
27th Australian Infantry Brigade
British 53rd Infantry Brigade

Re-raising
11 Infantry Division was re-raised on 1 April 1965 at Yol, Himachal Pradesh as 11 Mountain Division under the command of Major General N. C. Rawlley . The division was subsequently re-organised as an Infantry Division and relocated to Ahmedabad, Gujarat. It was expanded to its full strength by June 1971. The division had the following brigades-
31 Infantry Brigade at Bhuj
30 Infantry Brigade at Dhangadhra 
85 Mountain Brigade at Belgaum

Indo-Pakistani War of 1965

Soon after raising, the division moved first to Gurdaspur and then to Bhuj for Operation Ablaze. It took over operational control of the Kilo Sector on 29 June 1965. 31 Infantry Brigade of the division took part in Operation Kabaddi and 30 and 85 Infantry Brigades took part in Operation Riddle between September and October 1965. The 'order of battle' for the division was as follows -

Operation Kabaddi
31 Infantry Brigade (Brigadier S.S.M. Pahalajani) 
1 Mahar
2 Sikh Light Infantry
17 Rajputana Rifles
11 Field Regiment
226 Independent Workshop Company
373 Field Company
31 Infantry Brigade Signal Company
407 Medical Company

Operation Ablaze / Operation Riddle
30 Infantry Division (Brigadier J Guha)
5 Maratha Light Infantry
1 Garhwal Rifles
3 Guards 
13 Grenadiers (D Squadron) 
85 Infantry Brigade (Brigadier H.N. Summanwar) (after 18 September)
5 Maratha Light Infantry (from 30 Infantry Division) 
17 Madras 
3 Independent Armoured Squadron (from 1 Horse) (one troop)
Artillery regiments
95 Composite Mountain Regiment
167 Field Regiment (1673 Field Battery)
954 Heavy Mortar Battery

As the division had a large area of responsibility, the troop deployment was very thin on the ground. Pakistan's Army had the same problem and both forces made limited gains during the war. 30 Infantry Brigade captured Gadra in Sindh on 8 September 1965 and the division captured Dali on 19 September 1965. Pakistani troops captured Munabao railway station and the old fort at Kishangarh in Jaisalmer district. The division eventually captured 388 square kilometres of Pakistani territory in this sector.

Captain SK  Mathur of 5 Air Observation Post Flight was awarded the Maha Vir Chakra. The division also won 10 Vir Chakras.

Indo-Pakistani War of 1971

During Operation Cactus Lily, the division under Major General R.D.R. Anand was responsible for the Barmer sector. This area stretched from Pochheena in Jaisalmer district in the north to the inter-state boundary of Rajasthan and Gujarat in the south. The 'order of battle' for the division was as follows-
3 Independent Armoured Squadron (from 1 Horse)
17 Grenadiers (camels)
2 Grenadiers 
17 BSF
85 Infantry Brigade (Brigadier Gurjeet Singh Randhawa)
2 Rajputana Rifles
2 Mahar
10 Sikh
10 Sikh Light Infantry
31 Infantry Brigade
15 Kumaon
9 Madras
18 Madras
20 Rajput
330 Infantry Brigade
 10 Para (Commando) - operated under the area, but was directly under Headquarters, Southern Command
11 Artillery Brigade (Brigadier N.M.K. Nayar)
13 Field Regiment
164 Field Regiment
68 Field Regiment
218 Medium Regiment
1981 Light Battery
1521 AD Battery
Locating Battery
5 Independent Air Operations Flight

The Pakistani defence in the Barmer sector was weak, with only 55 Brigade of Pakistani 18 Division in the area. The 11th Division attacked on the evening of 4 December 1971 targeting to reach the 'Green belt' area around the Indus River near Hyderabad. 85 and 330 Brigades pushed towards Naya Chor along the rail line, 31 Brigade advanced to Chachra. In the absence of any strong resistance, the division quickly achieved major territorial gains and constructed a link between the Indian and Pakistani rail lines between Munabao in Rajasthan to Khokhrapar in Sindh to support further operations.

Despite the early gains, persistent air attacks by the Pakistan Air Force, supply and logistical problems and finally prolonged hesitation by the division halted the advance on the northern axis, before the troops reached Naya Chor. During this time, Pakistani troops were reinforced by 60 Brigade from 33 Division, which also took over the command of 55 Brigade. On the southern axis, 31 Brigade captured Chachra. Further advances were prevented as the ceasefire was declared. Following the operations, the division captured approximately 9,000 square kilometres of Pakistani territory, the largest in the western sector. The division won the following honours  - 
Battle honours
Parbat Ali - 10 Sikh, 2 Mahar, 164 Field Regiment, 68 Field Regiment
Chachro - 10 Para 
Gadra City - 15 Kumaon, 13 Field Regiment
Khinsar - 20 Rajput
Gallantry awards
Maha Vir Chakra
Lieutenant Colonel S Bhawani Singh (10 Para)
Lieutenant SS Walkar (18 Madras)
Vir Chakra - 26

Other operations

Operation Trident 

Kargil War (Operation Vijay)

Operation Parakram

The division has actively participated in rescue and relief operations during natural calamities in Gujarat.

Divisional insignia
The present formation sign has a black background signifying an infantry division and a Katar facing upwards. The motto of the division is जीत निश्चय (Jeet Nischay), which translates to Victory and Determination.

References

Further reading

External links
British Military History Far East 1930 - 47

Indian World War II divisions
Divisions of the Indian Army
British Indian Army divisions
D
Military units and formations established in 1940
Military units and formations disestablished in 1942